H C Mahadevappa is an Indian politician from the state of Karnataka.He belongs to Hadinaru, a village in Nanjangud taluk of Mysuru district.He pursued his early education in his village and later continued his studies in Mysuru and went on to study medicine. He was a member of the Karnataka Legislative Assembly and represented Tirumakudal Narsipur constituency.

Political party
He is from the Indian National Congress.

Ministry
He is the Minister for Public Works Department in the K. Siddaramaiah led Karnataka Government.

External links 
 Karnataka Legislative Assembly

Works and Achievements 

 Laid foundation stone for the new Madhava Mantri Dam to be constructed in T Narasipura - The historic Madhava Mantri Dam was built during Ganga period and it had benefited Talakadu farmers for hundreds of years. Now the dam is in a dilapidated state and is causing several breaches, destroying crops. Once the new dam comes up, there will be no breaches and the farmers of the area will immensely benefit from it
 Vendor Development & Investor Summit-2017 At Bengaluru: Road Show In City To Attract Investors: The event was held as part of ‘Invest Karnataka: Vendor Development & Investor Summit-2017’ that was held at Bengaluru International Exhibition Centre on 23 and 24 November 2017.
 Began Bengaluru-Mysuru Six-Lane Highway Works 
 Laid Foundation Stone For Ambedkar Statue In Gangothri
 Foundation Stone Laid For Nature Cure And Yoga College Building in Mysuru

References 

Living people
Indian National Congress politicians from Karnataka
Year of birth missing (living people)
Karnataka MLAs 2008–2013
Karnataka MLAs 2013–2018